City Shul is a Reform synagogue in downtown Toronto, founded in October 2012 and led by Rabbi Elyse Goldstein. The congregation meets at 300 Bloor Street West, in the same building as Bloor Street United Church.  Until September 2017, meetings were held at the Wolfond Centre for Jewish Campus Life, near the St George campus of the University of Toronto.

City Shul was founded to serve the growing Jewish population in downtown Toronto. It is part of the Downtown Jewish Community Council of Toronto.

City Shul is noted for its diverse population, and includes members who are visible minorities, LGBT, Jews-by-choice and those who are exploring Judaism. The Shul also includes members who were raised in different Jewish traditions, such as Ashkenazi or Sephardi Jews, and those who come from a variety of Jewish religious movements including Orthodox, Conservative, and Reconstructionist. City Shul accepts non-Jews as voting members, with the requirement that members of the Leadership Team be Jewish (by birth or conversion).

Services at City Shul are fully egalitarian; men and women participate equally. The service is conducted primarily in Hebrew and the shul uses Gates of Prayer, the Reform Prayerbook; transliterations are provided.

City Shul was formally accepted as a member of the Union for Reform Judaism in December 2013.

References

External links 

Ashkenazi Jewish culture in Toronto
Reform synagogues in Canada
Sephardi Jewish culture in Canada
Sephardi Reform Judaism
Synagogues in Toronto